Jim Hinds (6 June 1937 – 2010) was a British cyclist. He competed in the individual road race and team time trial events at the 1960 Summer Olympics.

References

External links
 

1937 births
2010 deaths
British male cyclists
Olympic cyclists of Great Britain
Cyclists at the 1960 Summer Olympics
People from Streatham
Cyclists from Greater London